Defending champions Tímea Babos and Kristina Mladenovic defeated Hsieh Su-wei and Barbora Strýcová in the final, 6–1, 6–3 to win the doubles tennis title at the 2019 WTA Finals. It was Babos’ third straight title, as she also won in 2017 (partnering Andrea Sestini Hlaváčková).

Strýcová secured the year-end world No. 1 ranking by reaching the final. Aryna Sabalenka and Mladenovic were also in contention for the individual top ranking. The team of Babos and Mladenovic ended the year as the No. 1 doubles team.

The competition returned to a round-robin format for the first time since 2015.

Seeds

Alternates

Draw

Finals

Red group

Purple group

Standings are determined by: 1. number of wins; 2. number of matches; 3. in two-player ties, head-to-head records; 4. in three-player ties, (a) percentage of sets won (head-to-head records if two players remain tied), then (b) percentage of games won (head-to-head records if two players remain tied), then (c) WTA rankings.

References

Main Draw

Finals
2019 doubles